Moyo Airport  is an airport in Uganda. It is one of the forty-six (46) airports in the country.

Location
Moyo Airport is located in the town of Moyo, Moyo District, West Nile sub-region, in Northern Uganda, close to the International border with South Sudan.

Overview
Moyo Airport is a small civilian airport that serves the town of Moyo. As of August 2011, the airport is not yet under the administration of the Uganda Civil Aviation Authority.

Airlines and destinations

External links
Location of Moyo Airport at Google Maps
 Uganda Civil Aviation Authority Homepage

Photos
 Airport Terminal Building at Panoramio.com
 Eagle Air (Uganda) Aeroplane Landing at Moyo

See also
 Moyo Town
 Moyo District
 Civil Aviation Authority of Uganda
 List of airports in Uganda
 Eagle Air (Uganda)

References

Airports in Uganda
Moyo District
Northern Region, Uganda
West Nile sub-region